Gollop-Wolfgang complex is a very rare genetic disorder which is characterized by skeletal and digital anomalies.

Signs and symptoms 

This complex consists of the following symptoms:

 Bifid femur
 Hypoplastic/aplastic tibia and ulnae bone
 Shortening of the limbs
 Ectrodactyly

Causes 

When the genome of an isolated case of Gollop-Wolfgang complex was analyzed, Asamoah et al. discovered a deletion in the long arm of chromosome 8, this deletion consisted of the absence of 8q11.23-q13.3.

Epidemiology 

According to OMIM, only 26 cases have been described in medical literature. According to ORPHANET, 200 cases have been reported.

References 

Genetic diseases and disorders